Heleomyzini is a tribe of flies in the family Heleomyzidae. There are about 10 genera and more than 180 described species in Heleomyzini.

Genera
These 10 genera belong to the tribe Heleomyzini:
 Acantholeria Garrett, 1921
 Amoebaleria Garrett, 1921
 Anorostoma Loew, 1862
 Heleomyza Fallén, 1810
 Lutomyia Aldrich, 1922
 Morpholeria C.B.Garrett, 1921
 Neoleria Malloch, 1919
 Pseudoleria Garrett, 1921
 Schroederella Enderlein, 1920
 Scoliocentra Loew, 1862

References

Further reading

External links

 

Heleomyzidae
Articles created by Qbugbot